Lyracystis radiata is an extinct genus of Cambrian eocrinoid echinoderm, fossils of which are known from the Burgess Shale of British Columbia, Canada. It is related to Gogia.

References

External links 
 

Burgess Shale animals
Blastozoa genera

Cambrian genus extinctions